Pseudocomotis scardiana is a species of moth of the family Tortricidae. It is found from Ecuador to Peru.

References

Moths described in 1905
Chlidanotini